Israel–Singapore relations, also referred to as Israeli–Singaporean relations, refers to the bilateral relations between the State of Israel and the Republic of Singapore. Relations between the two countries have been extremely cordial for more than half a century, which are influenced by their similar geopolitical state of affairs, being relatively small states surrounded by larger neighbors hostile to their continued existence.

Both countries first established diplomatic relations in May 1969, and they are known to share a special relationship with each other. The two nations enjoy an extensive security relationship, with Israeli and Singaporean arms industries such as Israel Aerospace Industries and ST Engineering engaging in joint development and a large level of military trade between the two countries.

Israel has an embassy in the Tanglin district of Singapore. On 21 March 2022, Singapore and Israel announced that Singapore would be establishing an embassy in Tel Aviv. Prior to that, Singapore was represented by a non–resident ambassador based in Singapore and had an honorary consulate in Tel Aviv.

History
Following Singapore's expulsion from Malaysia on 9 August 1965, Singapore established full diplomatic relations with Israel. However, Singapore kept the relationship on a low profile for the next thirty years due to its relationship with its Muslim neighbours Malaysia and Indonesia. The Singapore Government modelled its armed forces, the Singapore Armed Forces (SAF), including its conscription system, after the Israeli Defense Forces (IDF). From 1966, Israeli military advisers were brought in to assist in setting up and training the Singaporean military. Israel also supplied Singapore with military hardware including tanks and missiles. In 1968, an Israeli trade office was established in Singapore and subsequently upgraded to embassy status in 1968.

In April 1986, Singapore Minister for Foreign Affairs S. Dhanabalan visited Israel. In return, the Israeli President Chaim Herzog visited Singapore from 18 to 19 November 1986. Herzog's visit triggered angry protests from both the Malaysian and Indonesian governments. The Malaysian government threatened to stop Singapore's water supply across the Johor–Singapore Causeway, which the latter had heavily relied on prior to the introduction of NEWater. Despite this incident, Singapore refused to be intimidated and Israel–Singapore trade relations continued to expand. By 1991, Israel's trade with Singapore totalled US$79 million in exports and US$43 million in imports. According to Jacob Abadi, Singapore sought to project an image of impartiality towards the Arab–Israeli conflict. While maintaining defence and economic relations with Israel, Singapore endorsed UN Resolutions 242 and 338 in order to balance relations with its Muslim neighbors and the Arab world.

In February 2017, the Israeli Prime Minister Benjamin Netanyahu and his wife Sara visited Singapore. He was hosted by the Singaporean Prime Minister Lee Hsien Loong. During the visit, Prime Minister Lee spoke in favor of a two-state solution to the Israeli–Palestinian conflict. Unlike the 1986 state visit however, Netanyahu's presence did not attract much opposition from Malaysia and Indonesia. Netanyahu also met with members of the Singaporean Jewish community and visited Maghain Aboth Synagogue.

In March 2022, Singapore announced that it will establish an embassy in Tel Aviv, 53 years after the two nations first established diplomatic relations.

Agreements
In 2005, the two countries signed a pact to ease the flow of goods and investments between the two countries during a visit to Israel by Singapore Senior Minister Goh Chok Tong with members of the Israeli Cabinet as well as meeting Israeli Prime Minister Ariel Sharon. 

In February 2017, Prime Minister Benjamin Netanyahu became the first Israeli prime minister to visit Singapore in 30 years.

Singapore was one of 41 countries that abstained from voting on the Resolution 67/19 on "Status of Palestine in the United Nations" by the United Nations General Assembly on 29 November 2012 which granted Non-Member Observer State status to Palestine. In explaining the reasons for Singapore's abstention, Senior Minister of State Masagos Zulkifli stated that Singapore believes "that only a negotiated settlement consistent with UN Security Council Resolution 242 can provide the basis for a viable, long term solution" and that "both sides have legitimate rights and shared responsibilities, and must be prepared to make compromises to achieve the larger good of a lasting peace".

Cooperation

Business and trade
In 1990, the Singapore–Israel Chamber of Commerce first commenced operations.

In 2013, Singapore–Israel trade totaled S$1.956 billion, a 24.6% jump year-on-year from 2012, according to figures from the Embassy of Israel in Singapore and IE Singapore. Singapore is a net importer from Israel, and Israel exports mostly electrical equipment to Singapore, while Singapore exports mostly machinery and computer equipment to Israel.

Military
In January 1968, before diplomatic relations were established, Singapore made an agreement to purchase 72 surplus AMX-13 tanks from Israel. By the 1980s, Singapore had acquired over 350 of these tanks.

During the formative years of the Singapore Armed Forces (SAF) in the late 1960s, Singapore sought advice and consultation from experienced militaries to form a credible military post-independence. Israel responded and provided doctrine and training development. Due to sensitivities in a Muslim-dominant region, Singapore kept the co-operation low-profile.

Over the years, Israel has continued to advise Singapore on an array of military topics, ranging from night operations to aviation psychology. The defence and intelligence establishments of both countries conduct routine exchanges of information, and a small number of IDF officers serve in staff appointments within the Singapore Ministry of Defence (MINDEF). In 2012, it was reported that Singapore expressed interest in purchasing several Iron Dome defence system units and a deal took place four years later. 

Today, the two countries operate many of the same weapon platforms, including early warning aircraft, anti-tank and anti-aircraft missiles, aircraft and surveillance technologies. This is particularly true with respect to aerial systems (as the ground terrain of the two countries is very different). As such, the primary aircraft type make up of the Israeli and Singaporean air forces is nearly identical, with both countries operating the F-15E Strike Eagle, F-16 Fighting Falcon, F-35 Lightning II, G550 airborne early warning aircraft, C-130 Hercules, AH-64 Apache, and M-346 Master advanced training aircraft. They also operate similar submarines—larger variants of the German Type 212 submarine (Dolphin-class submarine and Invincible-class submarine respectively).

Situation in the Gaza Strip
The Singapore Government has expressed concern over Palestinian rocket attacks against Israeli civilians. In January 2009, the Singapore Ministry of Foreign Affairs said of the Gaza War, "This is an extremely disturbing development," that "It can only exacerbate the already grave humanitarian situation." Following the ceasefire, the Singapore Ministry of Foreign Affairs called it a "positive development" but remained "deeply concerned over the humanitarian situation in Gaza and urge all sides to take urgent steps to address the situation".

In July 2014, the Singapore Ministry of Foreign Affairs also issued a statement on the recent murder of the three Israeli teenagers in the West Bank. The statement said: "Singapore strongly condemns the killing of the three Israeli teenagers, who were first abducted on 12 June 2014. We convey our deepest condolences to the families of the victims and the people of Israel. Perpetrators of such heinous crimes must be swiftly brought to justice".

In the 2014 Gaza–Israel conflict, Singapore Minister for Foreign Affairs K. Shanmugam said the Palestinian militant organisation Hamas has "deliberately used civilians as [human] shields" and was responsible for rejecting the Egyptian proposal on 15 July 2014 for a ceasefire. In the same speech to the Singapore Parliament, he also said that Hamas had been consistently launching rocket attacks at Israel, numbering over 2,000 missiles at one point, and this was what prompted the start of Israel's operation to destroy these rocket-launching sites, the smuggling tunnels and the munitions stockpiles to prevent attacks on Israel civilians.

See also
History of the Jews in Singapore
International recognition of Israel

References

External links
 Israeli embassy in Singapore
Economic and Trade Department in Singapore

 
Singapore
Bilateral relations of Singapore